Orthia is a monotypic moth genus of the family Noctuidae. Its only species, Orthia augias, is found in the Brazilian state of Amazonas. Both the genus and species were first described by Gottlieb August Wilhelm Herrich-Schäffer in 1853.

References

Agaristinae
Monotypic moth genera